Gorodishche is the name of several inhabited localities in Russia.

Belgorod Oblast
As of 2010, three rural localities in Belgorod Oblast bear this name:
Gorodishche, Alexeyevsky District, Belgorod Oblast, a khutor in Alexeyevsky District
Gorodishche, Korochansky District, Belgorod Oblast, a selo in Korochansky District
Gorodishche, Starooskolsky District, Belgorod Oblast, a selo in Starooskolsky District

Bryansk Oblast
As of 2010, one rural locality in Bryansk Oblast bears this name:
Gorodishche, Bryansk Oblast, a selo in Gorodishchensky Selsoviet of Pogarsky District

Chelyabinsk Oblast
As of 2010, one rural locality in Chelyabinsk Oblast bears this name:
Gorodishche, Chelyabinsk Oblast, a selo in Krasnooktyabrsky Selsoviet of Varnensky District

Ivanovo Oblast
As of 2010, one rural locality in Ivanovo Oblast bears this name:
Gorodishche, Ivanovo Oblast, a village in Zavolzhsky District

Kaluga Oblast
As of 2010, two rural localities in Kaluga Oblast bear this name:
Gorodishche, Dzerzhinsky District, Kaluga Oblast, a village in Dzerzhinsky District
Gorodishche, Meshchovsky District, Kaluga Oblast, a village in Meshchovsky District

Kirov Oblast
As of 2010, three rural localities in Kirov Oblast bear this name:
Gorodishche, Nemsky District, Kirov Oblast, a village in Gorodishchensky Rural Okrug of Nemsky District
Gorodishche, Sanchursky District, Kirov Oblast, a selo in Gorodishchensky Rural Okrug of Sanchursky District
Gorodishche, Zuyevsky District, Kirov Oblast, a village in Oktyabrsky Rural Okrug of Zuyevsky District

Kostroma Oblast
As of 2010, two rural localities in Kostroma Oblast bear this name:
Gorodishche, Kostromskoy District, Kostroma Oblast, a village in Kotovskoye Settlement of Kostromskoy District
Gorodishche, Parfenyevsky District, Kostroma Oblast, a village in Matveyevskoye Settlement of Parfenyevsky District

Krasnoyarsk Krai
As of 2010, one rural locality in Krasnoyarsk Krai bears this name:
Gorodishche, Krasnoyarsk Krai, a selo in Gorodishchensky Selsoviet of Yeniseysky District

Kursk Oblast
As of 2010, six rural localities in Kursk Oblast bear this name:
Gorodishche, Dmitriyevsky District, Kursk Oblast, a village in Berezovsky Selsoviet of Dmitriyevsky District
Gorodishche, Kursky District, Kursk Oblast, a village in Besedinsky Selsoviet of Kursky District
Gorodishche, Ponyrovsky District, Kursk Oblast, a village in 2-y Ponyrovsky Selsoviet of Ponyrovsky District
Gorodishche, Kozinsky Selsoviet, Rylsky District, Kursk Oblast, a village in Kozinsky Selsoviet of Rylsky District
Gorodishche, Nikolnikovsky Selsoviet, Rylsky District, Kursk Oblast, a khutor in Nikolnikovsky Selsoviet of Rylsky District
Gorodishche, Sovetsky District, Kursk Oblast, a village in Gorodishchensky Selsoviet of Sovetsky District

Leningrad Oblast
As of 2010, four rural localities in Leningrad Oblast bear this name:
Gorodishche, Kirishsky District, Leningrad Oblast, a village in Pchevskoye Settlement Municipal Formation of Kirishsky District
Gorodishche, Kirovsky District, Leningrad Oblast, a village under the administrative jurisdiction of Naziyevskoye Settlement Municipal Formation of Kirovsky District
Gorodishche, Melegezhskoye Settlement Municipal Formation, Tikhvinsky District, Leningrad Oblast, a village in Melegezhskoye Settlement Municipal Formation of Tikhvinsky District
Gorodishche, Tsvylevskoye Settlement Municipal Formation, Tikhvinsky District, Leningrad Oblast, a village in Tsvylevskoye Settlement Municipal Formation of Tikhvinsky District

Moscow Oblast
As of 2010, eleven rural localities in Moscow Oblast bear this name:
Gorodishche, Chekhovsky District, Moscow Oblast, a village in Stremilovskoye Rural Settlement of Chekhovsky District
Gorodishche, Klinsky District, Moscow Oblast, a village in Petrovskoye Rural Settlement of Klinsky District
Gorodishche, Leninsky District, Moscow Oblast, a village in Voskresenskoye Rural Settlement of Leninsky District
Gorodishche, Gazoprovodskoye Rural Settlement, Lukhovitsky District, Moscow Oblast, a village in Gazoprovodskoye Rural Settlement of Lukhovitsky District
Gorodishche, Golovachevskoye Rural Settlement, Lukhovitsky District, Moscow Oblast, a village in Golovachevskoye Rural Settlement of Lukhovitsky District
Gorodishche, Volkovskoye Rural Settlement, Ruzsky District, Moscow Oblast, a village in Volkovskoye Rural Settlement of Ruzsky District
Gorodishche, Volkovskoye Rural Settlement, Ruzsky District, Moscow Oblast, a village in Volkovskoye Rural Settlement of Ruzsky District
Gorodishche, Volkovskoye Rural Settlement, Ruzsky District, Moscow Oblast, a village in Volkovskoye Rural Settlement of Ruzsky District
Gorodishche, Shakhovskoy District, Moscow Oblast, a village in Seredinskoye Rural Settlement of Shakhovskoy District
Gorodishche, Stupinsky District, Moscow Oblast, a village under the administrative jurisdiction of the Town of Stupino in Stupinsky District
Gorodishche, Voskresensky District, Moscow Oblast, a village in Fedinskoye Rural Settlement of Voskresensky District

Novgorod Oblast
As of 2010, three rural localities in Novgorod Oblast bear this name:
Gorodishche, Shimsky District, Novgorod Oblast, a village in Utorgoshskoye Settlement of Shimsky District
Gorodishche, Soletsky District, Novgorod Oblast, a village in Gorskoye Settlement of Soletsky District
Gorodishche, Volotovsky District, Novgorod Oblast, a village in Slavitinskoye Settlement of Volotovsky District

Novosibirsk Oblast
As of 2010, one rural locality in Novosibirsk Oblast bears this name:
Gorodishche, Novosibirsk Oblast, a village in Zdvinsky District

Orenburg Oblast
As of 2010, one rural locality in Orenburg Oblast bears this name:
Gorodishche, Orenburg Oblast, a selo in Gorodishchensky Selsoviet of Orenburg

Oryol Oblast
As of 2010, seven rural localities in Oryol Oblast bear this name:
Gorodishche, Bolkhovsky District, Oryol Oblast, a selo in Bagrinovsky Selsoviet of Bolkhovsky District
Gorodishche, Bashkatovsky Selsoviet, Mtsensky District, Oryol Oblast, a village in Bashkatovsky Selsoviet of Mtsensky District
Gorodishche, Telchensky Selsoviet, Mtsensky District, Oryol Oblast, a village in Telchensky Selsoviet of Mtsensky District
Gorodishche, Soskovsky District, Oryol Oblast, a village in Kirovsky Selsoviet of Soskovsky District
Gorodishche, Sverdlovsky District, Oryol Oblast, a village in Bogodukhovsky Selsoviet of Sverdlovsky District
Gorodishche, Uritsky District, Oryol Oblast, a selo in Gorodishchensky Selsoviet of Uritsky District
Gorodishche, Znamensky District, Oryol Oblast, a village in Znamensky Selsoviet of Znamensky District

Penza Oblast
As of 2010, three inhabited localities in Penza Oblast bear this name:
Gorodishche, Gorodishchensky District, Penza Oblast, a town in Gorodishchensky District
Gorodishche, Mokshansky District, Penza Oblast, a settlement in Chernozersky Selsoviet of Mokshansky District
Gorodishche, Zemetchinsky District, Penza Oblast, a settlement in Kirillovsky Selsoviet of Zemetchinsky District

Perm Krai
As of 2010, seven rural localities in Perm Krai bear this name:
Gorodishche, Dobryanka, Perm Krai, a village under the administrative jurisdiction of the city of  Dobryanka
Gorodishche, Osinsky District, Perm Krai, a village in Osinsky District
Gorodishche, Solikamsky District, Perm Krai, a selo in Solikamsky District
Gorodishche, Usolsky District, Perm Krai, a village in Usolsky District
Gorodishche, Yelovsky District, Perm Krai, a village in Yelovsky District
Gorodishche (Pozhvinskoye Rural Settlement), Yusvinsky District, Perm Krai, a village in Yusvinsky District; municipally, a part of Pozhvinskoye Rural Settlement of that district
Gorodishche (Maykorskoye Rural Settlement), Yusvinsky District, Perm Krai, a village in Yusvinsky District; municipally, a part of Maykorskoye Rural Settlement of that district

Pskov Oblast
As of 2010, eleven rural localities in Pskov Oblast bear this name:
Gorodishche, Bezhanitsky District, Pskov Oblast, a village in Bezhanitsky District
Gorodishche, Dnovsky District, Pskov Oblast, a village in Dnovsky District
Gorodishche (Artemovskaya Rural Settlement), Nevelsky District, Pskov Oblast, a village in Nevelsky District; municipally, a part of Artemovskaya Rural Settlement of that district
Gorodishche (Plisskaya Rural Settlement), Nevelsky District, Pskov Oblast, a village in Nevelsky District; municipally, a part of Plisskaya Rural Settlement of that district
Gorodishche, Novorzhevsky District, Pskov Oblast, a village in Novorzhevsky District
Gorodishche, Ostrovsky District, Pskov Oblast, a village in Ostrovsky District
Gorodishche, Palkinsky District, Pskov Oblast, a village in Palkinsky District
Gorodishche, Pechorsky District, Pskov Oblast, a village in Pechorsky District
Gorodishche, Pytalovsky District, Pskov Oblast, a village in Pytalovsky District
Gorodishche (Cherpesskaya Rural Settlement), Velikoluksky District, Pskov Oblast, a village in Velikoluksky District; municipally, a part of Cherpesskaya Rural Settlement of that district
Gorodishche (Lychevskaya Rural Settlement), Velikoluksky District, Pskov Oblast, a village in Velikoluksky District; municipally, a part of Lychevskaya Rural Settlement of that district

Rostov Oblast
As of 2010, one rural locality in Rostov Oblast bears this name:
Gorodishche, Rostov Oblast, a khutor in Yelizavetinskoye Rural Settlement of Azovsky District

Ryazan Oblast
As of 2010, one rural locality in Ryazan Oblast bears this name:
Gorodishche, Ryazan Oblast, a selo in Khodyninsky Rural Okrug of Rybnovsky District

Smolensk Oblast
As of 2010, six rural localities in Smolensk Oblast bear this name:
Gorodishche, Demidovsky District, Smolensk Oblast, a village in Vorobyevskoye Rural Settlement of Demidovsky District
Gorodishche, Gagarinsky District, Smolensk Oblast, a village in Tokarevskoye Rural Settlement of Gagarinsky District
Gorodishche, Khislavichsky District, Smolensk Oblast, a village in Gorodishchenskoye Rural Settlement of Khislavichsky District
Gorodishche, Safonovsky District, Smolensk Oblast, a village in Bogdanovshchinskoye Rural Settlement of Safonovsky District
Gorodishche, Ugransky District, Smolensk Oblast, a village in Mikhalevskoye Rural Settlement of Ugransky District
Gorodishche, Velizhsky District, Smolensk Oblast, a village in Zaozerskoye Rural Settlement of Velizhsky District

Tambov Oblast
As of 2010, one rural locality in Tambov Oblast bears this name:
Gorodishche, Tambov Oblast, a selo in Krivopolyansky Selsoviet of Bondarsky District

Republic of Tatarstan
As of 2010, three rural localities in the Republic of Tatarstan bear this name:
Gorodishche, Drozhzhanovsky District, Republic of Tatarstan, a selo in Drozhzhanovsky District
Gorodishche, Nizhnekamsky District, Republic of Tatarstan, a selo in Nizhnekamsky District
Gorodishche, Zelenodolsky District, Republic of Tatarstan, a village in Zelenodolsky District

Tver Oblast
As of 2010, eleven rural localities in Tver Oblast bear this name:
Gorodishche (Emmausskoye Rural Settlement), Kalininsky District, Tver Oblast, a village in Kalininsky District; municipally, a part of Emmausskoye Rural Settlement of that district
Gorodishche (Chernogubovskoye Rural Settlement), Kalininsky District, Tver Oblast, a village in Kalininsky District; municipally, a part of Chernogubovskoye Rural Settlement of that district
Gorodishche, Kimrsky District, Tver Oblast, a village in Kimrsky District
Gorodishche (Vakhoninskoye Rural Settlement), Konakovsky District, Tver Oblast, a village in Konakovsky District; municipally, a part of Vakhoninskoye Rural Settlement of that district
Gorodishche (Pervomayskoye Rural Settlement), Konakovsky District, Tver Oblast, a village in Konakovsky District; municipally, a part of Pervomayskoye Rural Settlement of that district
Gorodishche, Ostashkovsky District, Tver Oblast, a village in Ostashkovsky District
Gorodishche, Rzhevsky District, Tver Oblast, a village in Rzhevsky District
Gorodishche, Sandovsky District, Tver Oblast, a village in Sandovsky District
Gorodishche, Selizharovsky District, Tver Oblast, a village in Selizharovsky District
Gorodishche, Staritsky District, Tver Oblast, a village in Staritsky District
Gorodishche, Udomelsky District, Tver Oblast, a village in Udomelsky District

Tyumen Oblast
As of 2010, one rural locality in Tyumen Oblast bears this name:
Gorodishche, Tyumen Oblast, a village in Sorokinsky District

Vladimir Oblast
As of 2010, one rural locality in Vladimir Oblast bears this name:
Gorodishche, Vladimir Oblast, a selo in Yuryev-Polsky District

Volgograd Oblast
As of 2010, one urban locality in Volgograd Oblast bears this name:
Gorodishche, Volgograd Oblast, a work settlement in Gorodishchensky District

Vologda Oblast
As of 2010, four rural localities in Vologda Oblast bear this name:
Gorodishche, Cherepovetsky District, Vologda Oblast, a village in Domozerovsky Selsoviet of Cherepovetsky District
Gorodishche, Kichmengsko-Gorodetsky District, Vologda Oblast, a village in Kichmengsky Selsoviet of Kichmengsko-Gorodetsky District
Gorodishche, Kirillovsky District, Vologda Oblast, a village in Migachevsky Selsoviet of Kirillovsky District
Gorodishche, Vozhegodsky District, Vologda Oblast, a village in Yavengsky Selsoviet of Vozhegodsky District

Yaroslavl Oblast
As of 2010, four rural localities in Yaroslavl Oblast bear this name:
Gorodishche, Borisoglebsky District, Yaroslavl Oblast, a village in Davydovsky Rural Okrug of Borisoglebsky District
Gorodishche, Glebovsky Rural Okrug, Pereslavsky District, Yaroslavl Oblast, a village in Glebovsky Rural Okrug of Pereslavsky District
Gorodishche, Troitsky Rural Okrug, Pereslavsky District, Yaroslavl Oblast, a selo in Troitsky Rural Okrug of Pereslavsky District
Gorodishche, Uglichsky District, Yaroslavl Oblast, a village in Pokrovsky Rural Okrug of Uglichsky District